

Friedrich-Wilhelm Dernen (born February 15, 1884, in Köln, died February 15, 1967, in Bad Homburg) was a German officer in the Wehrmacht during World War II.

Awards

Pour le Mérite on 29 August 1918

German Cross in Gold on 11 January 1942 as Oberstleutnant in the III./Infanterie-Regiment 36

References

Citations

Bibliography

 

 
 

1884 births
1967 deaths
German Army personnel of World War I
German Army officers of World War II
Military personnel from Cologne
Recipients of the Pour le Mérite (military class)
Recipients of the Gold German Cross